The Borough of Copeland is a local government district with borough status in western Cumbria, England.  Its council is based in Whitehaven.  It was formed on 1 April 1974 by the merger of the Borough of Whitehaven, Ennerdale Rural District and Millom Rural District. The population of the Non-Metropolitan district was 69,318 according to the 2001 census, increasing to 70,603 at the 2011 Census.

The name is derived from an alternative name for the Cumberland ward of Allerdale above Derwent, which covered roughly the same area.

There are different explanations for the name. According to a document issued at the time of the borough's grant of arms, the name is derived from kaupland, meaning "bought land," referring to an area of the Forest bought from the estate of St Bees Priory.

In July 2021 the Ministry of Housing, Communities and Local Government announced that in April 2023, Cumbria will be reorganised into two unitary authorities.  Copeland Borough Council is to be abolished and its functions transferred to a new authority, to be known as Cumberland, which will cover the current districts of Allerdale, Carlisle, and Copeland.

Demographics
In 2014 the borough of Copeland was found to have the fattest population in England with a percentage of 75.9% being either overweight or obese (BMI greater than 25) according to official PHE statistics.

In 2018 Copeland had the third highest median income of UK local authorities, after the City of London and Tower Hamlets. However this median hides the wide differences in income between those who work at the Sellafield nuclear reprocessing site and elsewhere in the borough, leading to Copeland being described as 'a community of two-halves'.

Governance

Elections to the borough council are held every four years, with currently 51 councillors being elected at each election. Since the first election in 1973 the council has been under Labour control, apart from between 1976 and 1979 when it was under no overall control. As of the 2019 election the council is composed of the following councillors:

Directly elected mayor

On 22 May 2014 a referendum was carried out in the borough to change the style of governance in Copeland to a directly elected mayor, after campaigners from the Time For Change team successfully obtained enough signatures from 5% of the electorate in a petition. The referendum result was: For: 12,671; Against: 5,489.

The first election for mayor was held on 7 May 2015 and Mike Starkie (Independent),but now a conservative, was elected by 15,232 votes to the Labour Party candidate Steve Gibbon's 14,259 votes.

Freedom of the Borough
The following people and military units have received the Freedom of the Borough of Copeland.

 Gary McKee: 21 October 2017.

Map

Notes

References
 Hodgson, Geoffrey M. (2008) Hodgson Saga, second edition (Standon, Hertfordshire: Martlet Books).
 Wainwright, F. T. (1975) Scandinavian England: Collected Papers (Chichester: Phillimore).
 Winchester, Angus J. L. (1985) 'The Multiple Estate: A Framework for the Evolution of Settlement in Anglo-Saxon and Scandinavian Cumbria', in Baldwin, John R. and Whyte, Ian D. (eds) (1985) The Scandinavians in Cumbria (Edinburgh: The Scottish Society for Northern Studies), pp. 89–101.

External links
Copeland information website

 
Non-metropolitan districts of Cumbria
1974 establishments in England
Boroughs in England